Hua Hong Semiconductor Limited is a publicly listed Chinese pure-play semiconductor foundry company based in Shanghai, established in 1996 as part of China's national efforts to boost its IC industry. Currently, Hua Hong's most advanced node is achieved by its subsidiary Shanghai Huali (HLMC), which can manufacture 28/22-nm process and is currently developing advanced 14-nm technology.

It is currently mainland China's second largest chip-maker behind rival SMIC and 6th largest globally, with a market share of 2.6% in 2Q21.

History
In 1996, Shanghai Huahong Microelectronics Co., Ltd. (now Huahong Group) was established as part of China's national efforts to boost its IC industry.

In 1997, a joint venture HHNEC was formed between Huahong and NEC China to produce DRAM for NEC. The company phased out DRAM production in 2003 and became a pure-play foundry.

In December 2000, Grace Shanghai was formed by Grace Cayman as a pure-play foundry.

In 2011, HHNEC and Grace Shanghai was merged to form Shanghai Huahong Grace Semiconductor Manufacturing Corporation, which later fell under Hua Hong Group, a fully owned subsidiary of Hua Hong Semiconductor Limited.

Locations

The company currently operates three 200mm wafer fabs (HH Fab1, HH Fab2, and HH Fab3) in Shanghai located in Jinqiao, Zhangjiang and Zhangjiang respectively, with total monthly 200mm wafer capacity of approximately 180,000 wafers.

There is an R&D center (ICRD) located adjacent to Hua Hong and SMIC fabs in Zhangjiang, operated in conjunction with other integrated circuit companies, universities and research institutes, researching 7-5 nm development on 300mm wafers.

Hua Hong also owns two 300mm fabs (HH Fab5, HH Fab6) in Zhangjiang and Kangqiao, Shanghai through its subsidiary Shanghai Huali (HLMC).

There is also a new 300mm fab (HH Fab7) under construction in Wuxi's National High-Tech Industrial Development Zone.

Processes
Currently, Hua Hong's most advanced node is achieved by its subsidiary Shanghai Huali (HLMC), which can manufacture 28/22-nm process and is currently developing advanced 14-nm technology.

See also
Semiconductor industry
Semiconductor industry in China
List of semiconductor fabrication plants

References

Semiconductor companies of China